Joseph Andrew Quinn (June 7, 1886 – January 25, 1939) was an American lawyer, farmer, and politician.

Quinn was born in Lakeville, Dakota County, Minnesota and graduated from Central High School in Saint Paul, Minnesota in 1907. He graduated from St. Paul College of Law in 1914 and was admitted to the Minnesota bar. Quinn lived with his wife and family in Menahga, Wadena County, Minnesota. Quinn was also involved in the banking business and was a farmer. He served on the Eveleth School Board in Eveleth, Minnesota and served in the Minnesota House of Representatives from 1923 to 1928.

References

1886 births
1939 deaths
People from Lakeville, Minnesota
People from Menahga, Minnesota
Farmers from Minnesota
Businesspeople from Minnesota
Minnesota lawyers
William Mitchell College of Law alumni
School board members in Minnesota
Members of the Minnesota House of Representatives